Camp Souter is a former Military base located in Kabul, Afghanistan operated by the United Kingdom as part of International Security Assistance Force (ISAF) under Operation Herrick (OP H).

Units

 OP Herrick 5 - (October 2006 - April 2007)
 Elements of Royal Navy and Royal Marines personnel attached to 3 Commando Brigade and Commando Logistics Regiment providing the Medical support from Royal Navy MA's
 The 2nd Battalion Royal Regiment of Fusiliers
 OP Herrick 6 - (April 2007 - October 2007)
 23 Pioneer Regiment RLC: 187 SQN 206 SQN 518 SQN Kabul patrols company 
 OP Herrick 7 - (October 2007 - April 2008)
 No. 1 Company, 1st Battalion, Coldstream Guards
 Sniper Section, 1st Battalion, Coldstream Guards
 OP Herrick 8 - (April 2008 – October 2008)
 A Company, Royal Highland Fusiliers, 2nd Battalion, The Royal Regiment of Scotland (2 SCOTS)
 Souter Force Protection Transport Company (2012)

References

Citations

Bibliography

War in Afghanistan (2001–2021)
Military bases of the United Kingdom in Afghanistan